Făgădău may refer to several places in Moldova:

 Făgădău, a village in Ciolacu Nou Commune, Făleşti district
 Făgădău, a village in Văscăuţi Commune, Floreşti district